The King David School is an independent  comprehensive co-educational early learning, primary, and secondary progressive Jewish day school, located in Armadale, a suburb of Melbourne, Victoria, Australia. The school currently caters for approximately 800 students from early learning to Year 12, and is affiliated with the Victorian Union of Progressive Judaism.

History
The King David School was first envisioned in the 1970s, by several progressive Jews in Melbourne, and rabbis from Temple Beth Israel. The School was first purchased in 1978, on Kooyong Road and was named the Joyce and Mark Southwick Campus, named after two key influential figures in the School's opening.

In 1978, the School, the first ever Progressive Jewish Day School in Australia, opened its doors to 45 students. Its principal at that time was Norman Rothman. In 1984, the Magid Campus was purchased on Orrong Road, honouring Isadore Magid, a great supporter of the School.

The School rapidly rose in student numbers, and celebrated the centennial year of 2000 by extending to Year 12 for the first time in its history.

Campuses
The King David School consists of three campuses in the Metropolitan Armadale area of Melbourne, close to the city's Jewish community. These campuses are the Junior School (Kinder to Year 5) and the Senior School (Magid Campus) for Years 6 to 12 students), and the Rebecca Magid Center (opposite the Senior School) which is a performing, visual arts and sports centre.

Curriculum
King David School prepares students for the Victorian Certificate of Education (VCE), achieving high academic results. The school's LOTE (Languages Other Than English) program includes Hebrew, French and Mandarin.

Co-curriculum
King David School offers co-curricular programs in sport, music, drama, debating, outdoor education, STEM programs and in 2019 they launched their first F1 in schools team. In 2008 they became the first known school to run a teacher sanctioned Dream Team league.

Sport 
The school's sports program is facilitated through its membership of the Eastern Independent Schools of Melbourne (EISM).

EISM Premierships 
King David School has won the following EISM senior premierships.

Boys:

 Basketball (2) - 2013, 2018
 Table Tennis (3) - 2005, 2012, 2014
 Tennis (4) - 2013, 2015, 2019, 2020

Girls:

 Basketball (2) - 2014, 2015
 Netball - 2013
 Table Tennis - 2014

Notable alumni

David Eldar – World Scrabble champion 2017 and professional poker player
Sara Reed – actress
Nevo Zisin – writer and transgender rights activist
Talia Zucker – television and film actress
Alexandra Kiroi-Bogatyreva, rhythmic gymnast, 2018 Commonwealth Games dual bronze medallist and national senior champion in 2018 and 2019

See also

 King David School (disambiguation)
 Secular Jewish culture
 Torah study
 Reform Judaism
 List of non-government schools in Victoria
 Judaism in Australia

References

External links
 King David School Website

Educational institutions established in 1977
Eastern Independent Schools of Melbourne
Jewish day schools
Junior School Heads Association of Australia Member Schools
Jewish schools in Melbourne
Jews and Judaism in Melbourne
1977 establishments in Australia
Buildings and structures in the City of Stonnington